Peter Jason Rentfrow is professor of personality and individual differences in the Psychology Department at Cambridge University, where he directs the Social Dynamics Research Center. He is an  elected Fellow of the Association for Psychological Science, the Society for Personality and Social Psychology, and the Alan Turing Institute.

Biography 
Rentfrow was born in Louisiana and later moved to Texas, where he graduated from Kingwood High School. He studied psychology at the University of Texas at Austin, where he earned his BA in 1998 and PhD in 2004 under the supervision of Samuel D. Gosling, William B. Swann, and James W. Pennebaker. Rentfrow joined the faculty of the Psychology Department at Cambridge University in 2005.

Research 
Rentfrow's research interests include geographical psychology, music psychology, and psychological assessment. His research seeks to understand the ways in which personality traits interact with the environment and become expressed in everyday life.

Geographical psychology 
Rentfrow's research in geographical psychology demonstrates that social influence, ecological influence, and selective migration are key mechanisms that contribute to the spatial clustering of psychological characteristics.

Personal tastes and preferences 
His work in this area seeks to understand the degree to which personal preferences reflect and effectively communicate information about people’s psychological characteristics.

Psychological and behavioral assessment 
In collaboration with Samuel D. Gosling, he developed the Ten-Item Personality Inventory,  a brief measure of the Big Five personality traits. Also with Gosling, he developed the Short Test of Musical Preferences, an individual difference measure designed to assess musical preferences. With Lewis R. Goldberg and Daniel J. Levitin, he developed an audio-based measure of musical preferences in which respondents report their effective reactions to excerpts of various pieces of music. In addition to traditional self-report measures, Rentfrow has collaborated with computer scientist Cecilia Mascolo to develop a mobile sensing platform for measuring behavior and psychological states unobtrusively.

Honours 
Rentfrow is an elected Fellow of the Association for Psychological Science, the Society for Personality and Social Psychology, and the Alan Turing Institute.

He edited Geographical Psychology, which reviews the state of the science on the ways in which psychological traits vary across geographic regions. With Daniel J. Levitin, he co-edited Foundations in Music Psychology, which reviews the state of the science on the neurological, cognitive, and social psychological bases of musical experiences. Rentfrow has served as a member of the senior editorial team for five psychology journals, including Personality and Social Psychology Bulletin and Social Psychological and Personality Science.

Publications

Books 
Rentfrow, Peter J., ed.  Geographical Psychology: Exploring the Interaction of Environment and Behavior. Washington, D.C.: American Psychological Association, 2014.
 Rentfrow, Peter J., and Daniel J. Levitin, eds.Foundations in Music Psychology: Theory and Research. 2019.

Most-cited peer-reviewed papers 

 Gosling SD, Rentfrow PJ, Swann Jr WB. A very brief measure of the Big-Five personality domains. Journal of Research in Personality. 2003 Dec 1;37(6):504-28 (Cited 8030 times, according to Google Scholar) 
Rentfrow PJ, Gosling SD. The do re mi's of everyday life: the structure and personality correlates of music preferences. Journal of Personality and Social Psychology. 2003 Jun;84(6):1236 (Cited 1814 times, according to Google Scholar.)  
 Rentfrow PJ, Gosling SD, Potter J. A theory of the emergence, persistence, and expression of geographic variation in psychological characteristics. Perspectives on Psychological Science  2008 Sep;3(5):339-69 (Cited 542 times, according to Google Scholar. 
Rentfrow PJ, Gosling SD. Message in a ballad: The role of music preferences in interpersonal perception. Psychological Science. 2006 Mar;17(3):236-42 (Cited 559 times, according to Google Scholar.)
Rentfrow PJ, Goldberg LR, Levitin DJ. The structure of musical preferences: a five-factor model. Journal of Personality and Social Psychology. 2011 Jun;100(6):1139 (Cited 375 times, according to Google Scholar.)

References

External links 
 Department Webpage: Dr Jason Rentfrow  
 Personality and Social Dynamics Research Center page: Dr. Jason Rentfrow (PI)
 Social Psychology Network page: Peter Jason Rentfrow

Year of birth missing (living people)
Living people
University of Texas at Austin alumni
Academics of the University of Cambridge
American expatriate academics
21st-century American psychologists